Bryant is a ghost town in Greenbrier County, West Virginia, United States. Bryant appeared on Soil Conservation Service maps as late as 1937.

References

Geography of Greenbrier County, West Virginia
Ghost towns in West Virginia